The Battle of Cable Street was a series of clashes that took place at several locations in the inner East End, most notably Cable Street, on Sunday 4 October 1936. It was a clash between the Metropolitan Police, sent to protect a march by members of the British Union of Fascists led by Oswald Mosley, and various de jure and de facto anti-fascist demonstrators, including local trade unionists, communists, anarchists, British Jews, supported in particular by Irish workers, and socialist groups. The anti-fascist counter-demonstration included both organised and unaffiliated participants.

Background
The British Union of Fascists (BUF) had advertised a march to take place on Sunday 4 October 1936, the fourth anniversary of their organisation. Thousands of BUF followers, dressed in their Blackshirt uniform, intended to march through the heart of the East End, an area which then had a large Jewish population. 

The BUF would march from Tower Hill and divide into four columns, each heading for one of four open air public meetings where Mosley and others would address gatherings of BUF supporters: 
 Salmon Lane, Limehouse at 5pm
 Stafford Road, Bow at 6pm
 Victoria Park Square, Bethnal Green at 6pm
 Aske Street, Shoreditch at 6:30pm

The Jewish People's Council organised a petition, calling for the march to be banned, which gathered the signature of 100,000 East Londoners, including the Mayors of the five East London Boroughs (Hackney, Shoreditch, Stepney, Bethnal Green and Poplar) in two days. Home Secretary John Simon denied the request to outlaw the march.

Numbers involved
Very large numbers of people took part in the events, in part due to the good weather, but estimates of the numbers of participants vary enormously:
 Estimates of Fascist participants range from 2,000–3,000 up to 5,000.
 There were 6,000-7,000 policemen, including many mounted police. The Police had wireless vans and a spotter plane sending updates on crowd numbers and movements to Sir Philip Game's HQ, established on a side street by Tower Hill.
 Estimates of the number of anti-fascist counter-demonstrators range from 100,000 to 250,000, 300,000, 310,000 or more.

Events

Tower Hill
The fascists began to gather at Tower Hill from approximately 2:00 p.m., there were clashes between fascists and anti-fascists at Tower Hill and Mansell Street as they did so, while the anti-fascists also temporarily occupied the Minories. The BUF set up a casualty dressing station in the Tower Hill area, as did their Independent Labour Party and Communist opponents who each had a dressing station.

Aldgate and its approaches
The largest confrontation took place around Aldgate, where the conflict was between those seeking to block the BUF march, and the Metropolitan Police who were trying to clear a route for the march to proceed along. The streets around Aldgate were broad, and impossible to effectively barricade, except by blocking it with large crowds of determined people. These efforts were helped when a number of tram cars were abandoned in the road by their drivers, possibly deliberately.

There were dense crowds along the A11 (the length of Aldgate High Street, Whitechapel High Street and some way along Whitechapel Road) and its side streets, with the greatest concentration of people at Gardiner's Corner; the junction of Whitechapel High Street with Leman Street (leading from Tower Hill), Commercial Street and Commercial Road (the junction of Commercial Road and Whitechapel High Street has since moved east by 100 metres).

Cable Street
Protesters built a number of barricades on narrow Cable Street and its side streets. The main barricade was by the junction with Christian Street, about 300 metres along Cable Street in the St George in the East area of Wapping. Just west of the main barricade, another barricade was erected on Back Church Lane; the barrier was erected under the railway bridge, just north of the junction with Cable Street.

The Police attempts to take and remove the barricades were resisted in hand-to-hand fighting and also by missiles, including rubbish, rotten vegetables and the contents of chamber pots thrown at the police by women in houses along the street.

Decision at Tower Hill
Mosley arrived in an open topped black sports car, escorted by Blackshirt motorcyclists, just before 3:30. By this time, his force had formed up in Royal Mint Street and neighbouring streets into a column nearly half a mile long, and was ready to proceed. 

However, the police, fearing more severe disorder if the march and meetings went ahead, instructed Mosley to leave the East End, though the BUF were permitted to march in the West End instead. The BUF event finished in Hyde Park.

Arrests
About 150 demonstrators were arrested, with the majority of them being anti-fascists, although some escaped with the help of other demonstrators. Around 175 people were injured including police, women and children.

Aftermath
The anti-fascists were delighted by their success in preventing the march, and by the unity of the community response, in which very large numbers of East-Enders of all backgrounds resisted Mosley.  The event is frequently cited by modern Antifa movements as "...the moment at which British fascism was decisively defeated". The Fascists presented themselves as the law-abiding party who were denied free speech by a weak government and police force in the face of mob violence. After the event the BUF experienced an increase in membership, although their activity in Britain was severely limited.

Following the battle, the Public Order Act 1936 outlawed the wearing of political uniforms and forced organisers of large meetings and demonstrations to obtain police permission. Many of the arrested demonstrators reported harsh treatment at the hands of the police.

Notable participants

British Union of Fascists
 Sir Oswald Mosley
 Tommy Moran

Metropolitan Police
 Sir Philip Game

Counter-demonstrators
Many leading British communists were present at the Battle of Cable Street, some of whom partially credited the battle for shaping their political beliefs. Some examples include:
 Bill Alexander; communist and the commander of the International Brigade's British Battalion.
 Fenner Brockway, Secretary of the Independent Labour Party.
 Jack Comer, a gangster of Jewish heritage.
 Father John Groser, Anglican priest and prominent Christian socialist.
 Gladys Keable; communist and the future children's editor of the Morning Star.
 Bill Keable; communist and the husband of Gladys Keable, who would become the Morning Stars director.
 Max Levitas, a Jewish Communist activist described by the Morning Star as the "last survivor of the Battle of Cable Street".
 Betty Papworth, communist organizer and wife of Bert Papworth.
 Phil Piratin, member of the Communist Party of Great Britain.
 Alan Winnington; communist, journalist and war correspondent.

Commemoration
Between 1979 and 1983, a large mural depicting the battle was painted on the side of St George's Town Hall. It stands in Cable Street, about 350 metres east of the main barricade that stood by the junction with Christian Street. A red plaque in Dock Street (just south of the Royal Mint Street, Leman Street, Cable Street, Dock Street junction) also commemorates the incident.

Numerous events were planned in East London for the battle's 75th anniversary in October 2011, including music and a march, and the mural was once again restored. In 2016, to mark the battle's 80th anniversary, a march took place from Altab Ali Park to Cable Street. The march was attended by some of those who were originally involved.

In popular culture 

 The Arnold Wesker play Chicken Soup with Barley depicts an East End Jewish family on the day of the Battle of Cable Street.
 British folk punk band The Men They Couldn't Hang relate the battle in their 1986 song "Ghosts of Cable Street".
 The 2010 BBC revival of the Upstairs Downstairs series devotes an episode to the Battle of Cable Street.
 The incident is depicted in the 2012 novel Winter of the World by Welsh-born author Ken Follett.
 The song "Cable Street" by English folk trio The Young'uns tells the story of the confrontation from the perspective of a young anti-fascist fighter.
 The song "Cable Street Again" by the Scottish black metal band Ashenspire references the Battle of Cable Street in its title and lyrics.
 The book Night Watch by Terry Pratchett features a Battle of Cable Street.

See also
 Battle of George Square – a riot in Glasgow in 1919 in which William Gallacher (a colleague of Phil Piratin) was involved 
 Battle of Stockton – an earlier incident between BUF members and anti-fascists in Stockton-on-Tees on 10 September 1933
 Battle of South Street – an incident between BUF members and anti-fascists in Worthing on 9 October 1934
 Battle of De Winton Field – a clash between BUF members and anti-fascists in the Rhondda on 11 June 1936
 Battle of Holbeck Moor – a clash between BUF members and anti-fascists in Leeds on 27 September 1936 
 Battle of Stepney – a gunfight that took place in 1911, a few streets away
 Christie Pits riot – a similar incident that took place in Toronto on 16 August 1933
 6 February 1934 crisis – a similar event that took place in Paris
 Battle of Praça da Sé – a similar event that took place in São Paulo in 1934
 National Socialist Party of America v. Village of Skokie – a court case arising from a similar situation, a planned fascist march and the response to it

References

External links

 The Battle of Cable Street 80th anniversary
 News footage from the day News reel from youtube.com
 Video for the Ghosts of Cable Street by 'They Men They Couldn't Hang' set to images of the battle
 Historical article by David Rosenberg linked to the 'battle's 75th anniversary
 The Battle of Cable Street as told by the Communist Party of Britain.
 "Fascists and Police Routed at Cable Street" a personal account of the battle by a participant.
 Cable Street and the Battle of Cable Street.
 Google Earth view of the junction of Cable Street and Christian Street as it is now
 The Myth of Cable Street on the History Today website
 A police constable's account – Tom Wilson was on duty at Cable Street

1936 in London
20th century in the London Borough of Tower Hamlets
Anti-fascism in the United Kingdom
Antisemitic attacks and incidents in Europe
Battles and conflicts without fatalities
Fascism in England
October 1936 events
Political riots
Race riots in England
Racially motivated violence in England
Riots and civil disorder in England
Riots in London